Louise Lindh (born 1979) is a Swedish billionaire businesswoman. She owns 14% of L E Lundbergforetagen, the family's holding company, which owns property, pulp and paper companies, and was founded by her grandfather Lars Erik Lundberg. As of March 31, 2022, she held 1% of capital value, and 1.3% of the voting shares, of Industrivärden, a nordic investment company.

She was born in 1979, the daughter of Fredrik Lundberg.

Lindh runs Lundbergforetagen's property division, and has been a director of L E Lundbergföretagen since 2010.

Lindh is married, and lives in Stockholm, Sweden.

References

1979 births
Female billionaires
Living people
Lundberg family
Swedish businesspeople
Swedish billionaires